This is a list of law schools in Slovakia.

 Bratislava School of Law
 Comenius University in Bratislava Faculty of Law (:sk:Právnická fakulta Univerzity Komenského v Bratislave)
 Matej Bel University
 University of Pavol Jozef Šafárik
 University of Trnava

Law
Slovakia